The Advanced Academy of Georgia was a residential joint high school and early college entrance program at the University of West Georgia in Carrollton, Georgia. It was established by Dr. Beheruz Sethna in the 1995–1996 academic year. It stopped accepting new residential students during the 2015-2016 academic year, and the program was phased out in May 2017.

Academics

The Advanced Academy did not focus on a specific discipline, and therefore required a minimum GPA, minimum SAT and ACT scores, and that its applicants be on the College Preparatory track. The program traditionally accepted students during their high school junior and high school senior years, though younger students considered to be exceptionally gifted have been accepted.

While enrolled, students were free to pursue whatever discipline they wanted, provided they met the credit requirements for graduation at their high-school.  Because of changes to the College Credit Now program, one 3-4 credit hour college class "counts" as a full unit of high school credit.  Therefore, students earned a full year of high school credit in one semester at the college level.

Student life
Students were housed in Gunn Hall, a residence hall on the south-eastern corner of the Carrollton campus.  Previously housing both young Academy students and typical college-aged honors students, Gunn Hall was for a time dedicated solely for housing Academy students and support staff, but shrunk to one wing of the building in Fall 2014.

Since the students were housed together, they often formed strong relationships during their time in the program. The administration of the program encouraged this sense of community, providing activities such as Thursday Night Dinner, at which guests came and spoke to the students of the Academy on a variety of subjects, and regular events in Gunn Hall and around the campus specifically for the Academy students.

Several events for Academy students became yearly traditions.  Among these were prom, a collaborative poetry and music performance called "Coffee House", and "The Decathlon".  The last of these was a very significant event for many current and former Academy students, in which two teams drawn up from both current students and alumni competed against each other in many different events, which included sports, board games, a scavenger hunt, and an engineering contest, known as the "Challenge." The Decathlon would tend to inspire a great deal of camaraderie among the residents of a floor, while creating drama and competition between the floors as a whole. The Decathlon always took place on the weekend immediately preceding Martin Luther King, Jr. Day in January and served as a time of reunion for former students and housing staff, who often came and stayed in Gunn Hall for the weekend and participated alongside current students in the competitions.

Academy students were allowed to participate in any extracurricular clubs or activities on campus except for social fraternities and NCAA athletic teams. Advanced Academy students have, at various times, headed the school's robotics laboratory, intercollegiate mock trial team, Catholic Life Society, Asian Student Association, and the student LGBT support group, Lambda.  Past students have gone on to take professional or leadership roles in the West Georgia community, including student newspaper editor, Housing and Residence Life staff, and Honors College staff.

Changes for the 2016-2017 Academic Year
As the program was phased out in 2017, the Advanced Academy faced many changes in preparation for its discontinuation. Instead of accepting new residential students, the program only accepted new students who planned to commute to the school. The students who were returning from the 2015-2016 year (which included 2 international students) still planned to finish their high school education in the residential program, and were accommodated at the Oaks residence hall instead of their usual location at Gunn hall. The juniors during the 2016-2017 academic year were transferred to the school's normal dual-enrollment program for the following year. The 2016-2017 academic year also saw the removal of many events and practices designed to build community among Academy students, including mandatory Thursday Night Dinners and the Decathlon. The blue and green books, which were designed to ensure that the staff knew the location of each student and whether they were in the residence hall for the night, became impractical and were replaced with an online form. The director at the time, Adriana Stanley, left in March 2017 and was replaced by Kate Theobald as the interim director until the program ended in May 2017.

Notable alumni
Over 750 students have attended The Advanced Academy of Georgia since its inception in the Fall Semester of 1995. Academy alumni have gone on to attend several prestigious colleges and universities, including Harvard University, Yale University, MIT, California Institute of Technology, Carnegie Mellon University, University of California, Berkeley, Stanford University, Brown University, Columbia University, University of Chicago, Northwestern University, Duke University, Johns Hopkins University, Emory University, Georgia Institute of Technology, Washington University in St. Louis, Wellesley College, University of Alabama, New York University, MCPHS University and several others. They have pursued degrees in several fields including pharmacy, law, medicine, engineering, sciences, and humanities.
Ajay Pillai '08 - The youngest person to ever graduate from a University System of Georgia institution with a 4-year degree.  Pillai came to the Academy at the age of 13, graduated with an honors degree in biochemistry at the age of 17, and went on to graduate with a Doctor of Medicine from Georgia Health Sciences University at the age of 21.
Nkosi Thandiwe '07 - Attended the Advanced Academy of Georgia from 2005-2007. In 2011, he was arrested and charged with one count of murder and two counts of aggravated assault for the Atlanta shooting that left Brittany Watts dead, paralyzed Lauren Garcia, and injured Tiffany Ferenczy. He was sentenced to life without parole plus 65 years in prison on 31 January 2013.

See also 
 Georgia Academy of Arts, Mathematics, Engineering and Science

References

External links
 The Advanced Academy of Georgia

Gifted education
University of West Georgia